Ibrahim ibn Tashfin (died 1147) was the seventh Almoravid Emir, who reigned shortly in 1146–1147. Once the news of the death of his father Tashfin ibn Ali reached Marrakech, he was proclaimed king while still an infant. He was soon replaced by his uncle Ishaq ibn Ali, but the Almohads quickly subdued Marrakech and killed both.

Sources

1147 deaths
Almoravid emirs
People from Marrakesh
Year of birth unknown
12th-century Berber people

12th-century Moroccan people